Richwoods High School is the most northern of the three regular public high schools in Peoria, Illinois, United States.  Opened as a township high school in 1957, it was brought into Peoria Public Schools District 150 in the 1960s.  Feeder middle schools are Mark Bills, Liberty Leadership, Rolling Acres, Von Steuben, and Reservoir Gifted.

History
Richwoods was originally the high school of Richwoods Township.  The name of the school when it opened in 1957 was Richwoods Community High School.  In the 1960s, the school was annexed to the city of Peoria, causing it to come under the purview of Peoria Public Schools (District 150).  A lengthy legal battle ensued, and District 150 was required to allow students from the original school district to attend District 150 schools until Peoria Heights High School could be built to replace it.

Academics
Richwoods uses an unweighted grade point average system, and a weighted class-ranking system.

As of the 2007–2008 school year, Richwoods is making AYP for No Child Left Behind as a result of the PSAE (Prairie State Achievement Exam) results from the RHS Class of 2008.

International Baccalaureate Program
In 2005, the first class of International Baccalaureate students graduated from Richwoods High School. Students in the IB Diploma program must take three Higher Level courses from Biology, History, Mathematics and English, and have choices to their Standard Level Classes, including Mathematics, Social Anthropology, Film, Physics, Psychology, Music, and Art.

School hours
Regular Daily: 7:30 am to 2:30 pm
Early Dismissal: 7:30 am to 1:30 pm
Half Days: 7:30 am to 10:30 am

Activities
Richwoods has forensics, football, ultimate, and basketball programs, among others.

The school publishes one in-school newspaper, "The Shield". Also the school publishes the yearbook, "The Excalibur."

Marching / Concert Band
The band plays at four concerts a year, at three parades, and at the home football games.  It also plays at the home games of the boys' basketball team. As of the 2019–2020 school year, the marching band participates in competitions.

Operation Snowball
Richwoods High School holds an Operation Snowball event annually. This event promotes awareness of substance abuse, mental health awareness, and healthy relationships. Recent past themes have included Candyland: "Life's Too Sweet to be a Dum-Dum" (2008) and Las Vegas: "Don't Gamble with your Life" (2007).

Plays and musicals
Twice a year, Richwoods High School students perform on-stage.  In the fall, students perform a play: in 2005, The Bad Seed; in 2006, Peter Pan; in 2007, Arsenic and Old Lace; in 2008,Our Town; and in 2009 "The Miracle Worker".  RHS produces musicals in the spring time: in 2004, Damn Yankees, in 2005, Guys and Dolls, in 2006, Fiddler on the Roof, in 2007, The Boy Friend, in 2008 Rodgers and Hammerstein's Cinderella, in 2009, Little Women, and in 2010, Thoroughly Modern Millie.

Madrigals
Every year, Richwoods has a madrigal dinner, performed in a traditional 15th-century style. Much of the singing is a cappella. Along with a core group of Madrigal Singers, there are other musical student groups which participate, including Ladies in Waiting, Men in Tights, a recorder ensemble, brass quintet, and a string quartet. As well as music, a variety of actors are involved in the madrigal dinners. There is usually a king and queen.

School dances
RHS hosts three dances for the entire school yearly: Homecoming, Vice Versa, and Prom.  Homecoming involves:
 Spirit Week with dress-up days for the whole school and Class Colors Day (freshmen: green; sophomores: white; juniors: blue; seniors: red).
 Pep assembly.  Part of the competition for the Spirit Stick and to encourage the football players for their game later that evening.
 Assembly introducing the Homecoming Queen nominees. Since the whole school votes for the Homecoming Queen, the candidates are introduced during a second hour assembly.
 Stunt Show involves the Olympics (three point shot contest, wheelbarrow race, tug-of-war) and a skit by each class.  Each skit contains two dances by dancers from each respective class.
 Homecoming Game: a home game that is usually well-attended.
 Homecoming Dance takes place in Richwoods' terrazzo area (like a foyer) and lasts until 23:00.

Vice Versa is not as well attended as Homecoming, but there is a theme and the dress is based on that theme.  Traditionally, girls asked the boys to Vice Versa, hence the name of the dance.  Vice Versa involves:
 Assembly introducing the Vice Versa King nominees during second hour.  This assembly usually has more excitement because the candidates have on thematic dress.
 Vice Versa Dance. Couples dress up according to the theme.  Voting and crowning of the Vice Versa King occurs before the dance ends at 11:00PM.

Sports
The school colors are forest green, white, and gray and their mascot is the Knight.

Richwoods is a member of the Big Twelve League of the Illinois High School Association.

The Lady Knights basketball team won the Class 3A State Championship for the 2008–09 season. They also won the Class AA State Championship in 2005.

Notable alumni
 J. Michael Adams — 6th President of Fairleigh Dickinson University 1999–present; 8th President, International Association of University Presidents; Dean, Antoinette Westphal College of Media Arts and Design 1986-1999
 Nancy Brinker — Ambassador and founder of Susan G. Komen for the Cure (in memory of her sister who was also an alumna of Richwoods High School); United States Ambassador to Hungary starting in 2001; Chief of Protocol of the United States 2007–2009.
 Aaron Schock a 2000 graduate — U.S. Congressman, politician: elected youngest member of District 150 school board in 2001, eventually becoming school board president; Republican member of the Illinois House of Representatives, representing the 92nd district in the Illinois General Assembly from 2005 to 2009; elected to succeed Congressman Ray LaHood as a member of the United States House of Representatives from the 18th District of Illinois in November 2008, beginning his term in January 2009.
 Jamar Smith - Professional basketball player for Limoges CSP in France, former Illinois Fighting Illini basketball player
 Ryan Martinie - Bass player for progressive metal band Mudvayne
 Sherrick McManis - Professional football player for the Chicago Bears
 Rick Telander - Sportswriter and author
 Raja Krishnamoorthi - U.S. Congressman for Illinois' 8th Congressional District

References

 http://www.ihsa.org/
 Peoria Journal Star
 Peoria Public Schools

External links
 Richwoods High School — official site
 Richwoods women's track and field website

Public high schools in Illinois
Education in Peoria, Illinois
Schools in Peoria County, Illinois
1957 establishments in Illinois
Educational institutions established in 1957